The 2020 Real Salt Lake season was the team's 16th year of existence, and their 16th consecutive season in Major League Soccer, the top division of the American soccer pyramid.

Background

Non-competitive

Preseason

2020 Visit Tucson Sun Cup

Competitions

MLS regular season

Note: The 2020 season was postponed on March 12 due to the COVID-19 pandemic. The season restarted on July 8 with the MLS is Back Tournament in Orlando (see below), followed by resumption of regular season games.

Standings

Western Conference table

Overall table

Results summary

Match results

MLS is Back tournament

Group stage 

Note: Group stage results of the MLS is Back Tournament were treated as regular season matches in the overall standings.

Matches

Knockout stage

U.S. Open Cup 

The 2020 U.S Open Cup was suspended on March 13 due to the COVID-19 pandemic, before being cancelled by the U.S. Soccer Federation on August 17.

Leagues Cup 

The 2020 Leagues Cup was canceled on May 19 due to the COVID-19 pandemic.

Stats

Squad appearances and goals
Last updated January 11, 2021.

|-
! colspan="14" style="background:#A51E36; color:#DAAC27; text-align:center"|Goalkeepers

|-
! colspan="14" style="background:#A51E36; color:#DAAC27; text-align:center"|Defenders

|-
! colspan="14" style="background:#A51E36; color:#DAAC27; text-align:center"|Midfielders

|-
! colspan="14" style="background:#A51E36; color:#DAAC27; text-align:center"|Forwards

|-
|}

Assists and shutouts
Stats from MLS regular season, MLS playoffs, CONCACAF Champions league, and U.S. Open Cup are all included.
First tie-breaker for assists and shutouts is minutes played.

Club

Roster
 Age calculated as of the start of the 2019 season.
,

Transfers

In

Out

Notes

Loans

In

Out

Trialist

Notes

References

Real Salt Lake seasons
Real Salt Lake
Real Salt
Real Salt